Garin Wolf is an American television writer and playwright.

Career

Television
As the World Turns
Associate head writer: 1985 - 1988 (hired by Douglas Marland), 1993–1995, 1995–1996
Co-head writer: 1995 (with Juliet Law Packer and Richard Culliton)

Batman: The Animated Series
Writer: 1992

General Hospital
Script writer: April 8, 2008 - July 2011
Associate head writer: 1997 - January 3, 2008, March 17, 2008 – July 25, 2011
Breakdown writer: 1997–July 22, 2011; February 21, 2012-August 2012 (hired by Karen Harris)
Head writer: January 4, 2008 - March 14, 2008; July 26, 2011 – February 20, 2012 
Script editor: January 4, 2008 - March 14, 2008 (replaced Elizabeth Korte)

General Hospital: Night Shift (hired by Robert Guza Jr.)
Script writer July 12, 2007 - October 4, 2007

Tiny Toon Adventures
Writer (with Charlie Adler)

Plays
There Used to Be Fireflies (Off-Broadway/Off Off Broadway)

Awards and nominations
Daytime Emmy Awards 
NOMINATIONS: (1997, 1998, 1999, 2000, 2003, 2004, 2005, 2008; Best Writing; General Hospital); (1986, 1989, 1996; Best Writing; As The World Turns)
WINS: (1999, 2003; Best Writing; General Hospital)
His first nomination was shared with Douglas Marland, Susan Bedsow Horgan, Jeannie Glynn, Patti Dizenzo, M.B. Hatch, Caroline Franz, Chris Auer, Meredith Post, Jane Willis, Steve Wasserman, Emily Squires, Courtney Sherman, Charles Dizenzo, Jessica Klein

Writers Guild of America Award 
NOMINATION: (1998 season; General Hospital)
WIN: (1997 season; General Hospital)

References

External links

TVGuide
TVByTheNumbers
SoapOperaSource

Place of birth missing (living people)
Year of birth missing (living people)
Living people
American soap opera writers
American screenwriters
American dramatists and playwrights